The Wichí are an indigenous people of Argentina and Bolivia.

Wichí may also refer to:

Other uses include:
Wichí languages, which include:
Wichí Lhamtés Güisnay, an indigenous language of Argentina and Chile
Wichí Lhamtés Nocten, an indigenous language of Bolivia and Argentina
Wichí Lhamtés Vejoz, an indigenous language of Argentina and Bolivia
Wichí – El Pintado, village and municipality in Chaco Province in northern Argentina